B-N-acetylglucosaminyl-glycopeptide b-1,4-galactosyltransferase is a galactosyltransferase.

It is classified under .

Genes

References

External links
 

Transferases
EC 2.4.1